Via Carpathia (also Via Carpatia) is a planned transnational highway network connecting Klaipėda in Lithuania with Thessaloniki in Greece. It is currently planned to open in 2025.

The Polish part of Via Carpatia has been named in 2021 after late President Lech Kaczyński.

History 
The route was initially agreed upon in 2006 by Lithuania, Poland, Slovakia and Hungary. In 2010, this group was joined by Romania, Bulgaria and Greece who signed the so called Łańcut Declaration.

On 22 June 2017, Poland and Ukraine signed a cooperation agreement for the construction of the road. Signatories indicated the road could be part of the Trans-European Transport Network (TEN-T).

Construction commenced in individual sections along the road with the entire road expected to open in 2025. 

The sections known to be under construction or completed are:

Branch 1:
 4 sections (184 kilometers) of S19 Expressway and 96 kilometers of S61 Expressway in Poland
 Parts of the M30 motorway in Hungary. The Hungarian section opened to public in October 2021 by completing the missing link between Miskolc and the Slovakian border.
 R4 expressway in Slovakia
Western part of A6 motorway in Romania (from Calafat to Lugoj)
New Europe Bridge over Danube, from Calafat, Romania  to Vidin, Bulgaria
Parts of Botevgrad-Vidin expressway in Bulgaria
Parts of Struma motorway in Bulgaria

Branch 2:
A1 motorway in Romania (from Arad to Bucharest)
A0 motorway south half-ring in Romania (from Bucharest West to Bucharest East)
A2 motorway in Romania (from Bucharest to Constanța)

Route description 
The road will run in a general north-south direction through central Europe from the Baltic Sea to the Mediterranean. Its northern terminus is the Lithuanian port city of Klaipėda. It will then cross the country eastward, pass through eastern Poland, eastern Slovakia and the Hungarian and Romanian border. It will continue in western Romania and western Bulgaria before entering Greece. Its southern terminus is the Greek port city of Thessaloniki. A fork in the south may continue eastwards through Romania to the Black Sea port town of Constanța.

See also 
 Three Seas Initiative
 European route E79
 New Europe Bridge
 Rail-2-Sea

References

External links 
 European Grouping of Territorial Cooperation (EGTC) Via Carpatia

Roads in Europe
Motorways in Poland
Motorways in Romania
Motorways in Bulgaria
Highways in Hungary
Motorways in Greece
Projects of the Three Seas Initiative